Over the course of its many years on television, the long-running British science fiction television series Doctor Who has not only seen changes in the actors to play the Doctor, but in the supporting cast as well.

Companions

The Doctor is usually accompanied in his travels by one to three companions (sometimes called assistants). These characters provide a surrogate with whom the audience can identify, and further the story by asking questions and getting into trouble, (similar to Dr. Watson in the Sherlock Holmes mysteries.) The Doctor regularly gains new companions and loses old ones; sometimes they return home, or find new causes on worlds they have visited. A few of the companions have died during the course of the series.

Recurring characters

UNIT personnel

Brigadier Sir Alistair Gordon Lethbridge-Stewart (Nicholas Courtney)
Kate Stewart [née Lethbridge-Stewart] (Beverley Cressman, Jemma Redgrave)
Captain Mike Yates (Richard Franklin)
Captain Erisa Magambo (Noma Dumezweni)
Corporal/Sergeant/Warrant Officer Benton (John Levene, Darren Plant, Steven Stanley)
Corporal Bell (Fernanda Marlowe)
Private Carl Harris (Clive Standen)
Petronella Osgood (Ingrid Oliver)

Other humans
This list includes characters who appear to be human and who are not known to be anything other than human, even if having originated extra-terrestrially.
Ashildr AKA Lady Me (Maisie Williams)
Captain Henry Avery (Hugh Bonneville)
Toby Avery (Oscar Lloyd)
Sophie Benson (Daisy Haggard)
Captain Carter of the Teselecta (Richard Dillane)
Nasreen Chaudhry (Meera Syal)
Prime Minister Winston Churchill (Ian McNeice)
computer programmer, unnamed (Jo Stone-Fewings)
Gwen Cooper (Eve Myles)
"Danny Boy" and Captain Archibald Hamish Lethbridge-Stewart (Mark Gatiss)
Special Agent Canton Everett Delaware III (W. Morgan Sheppard, Mark Sheppard)
Miss Dexter (Elize du Toit)
Charles Dickens (Simon Callow)
Queen Elizabeth I (Vivienne Bennett, Angela Pleasence, Joanna Page)
Queen Elizabeth II (Jeannette Charles, Herself [archival], Jessica Martin [voice], Angharad Baxter [body])
Queen Elizabeth X, a/k/a "Liz 10" (Sophie Okonedo)
Elliot (Samuel Davies)
female programmer, unnamed (Nisha Nayar)
Jenny Flint (Catrin Stewart)
floor manager, unnamed (Jenna Russell)
Midshipman Alonzo Frame (Russell Tovey)
French newsreader, unnamed (Anthony Debaeck)
Dr Paul-Ferdinand Gachet (Howard Lee)
Vincent van Gogh (Tony Curran)
Detective Inspector Gregson (Paul Hickey)
 Yvonne Hartman (Tracy-Ann Oberman)
Clive Jones (Trevor Laird)
Francine Jones (Adjoa Andoh)
Harriet Jones, former Prime Minister (Penelope Wilton)
Ianto Jones (Gareth David-Lloyd)
Leo Jones (Reggie Yates)
Letitia "Tish" Jones (Gugu Mbatha-Raw)
President John F. Kennedy (himself, wax sculpture)<ref>Additionally, Kennedy's assassination - which occurred on the day before Doctor Who premièred with "An Unearthly Child" (which took place one or two days before the assassination, as indicated by the presence of the French Revolution book in Remembrance of the Daleks) - is addressed in Silver Nemesis, "Dimensions in Time", "Rose", "The Cambridge Spy", and "Let's Kill Hitler". His assassination by Lee Harvey Oswald occurs off-screen during the events of Remembrance of the Daleks (at or about the time of episode 1's cliff-hanger or the beginning of episode 2), and a subtle reference is made in "Asylum of the Daleks" in which the two brief survivors of the starship Alaskas crash are named Harvey and Oswin Oswald'''.</ref>
Madame Kovarian (Frances Barber)
Tanya Lernov (Clare Jenkins)
President Abraham Lincoln (Robert Marsden, wax sculpture)
Charlotte Abigail Lux (Eve Newton)
Strackman Lux (Steve Pemberton)
Gustave Lytton (Maurice Colbourne)
Tony Mack (Robert Pugh)
Angie Maitland (Eve de Leon Allen)
Artie Maitland (Kassius Carey Johnson)
Mo (Alun Raglan)
Moira (Jennifer Hennessy) (The Pilot, Extremis)
Oliver Morgenstern (Ben Righton)
Lynda Moss (Jo Joyner)
Nerys (Krystal Archer)Nerys is mentioned by Donna Noble in the Tenth Doctor episode "The Doctor's Daughter".
President Richard M. Nixon (Stuart Milligan, wax sculpture, plastic mask.)
Sylvia Noble-Mott (Jacqueline King)Sylvia Noble appears in the Tenth Doctor episodes "The Runaway Bride", "Partners in Crime", "The Sontaran Stratagem", "The Poison Sky", "Turn Left", "The Stolen Earth", "Journey's End", and "The End of Time"
Lady Cassandra O'Brien.Δ17 (Zoë Wanamaker)
 Dave Oswald (Michael Dixon, James Buller)
 Ellie Oswald (Nicola Sian)
Alfie Owens a/k/a Stormageddon Dark Lord of All (Isabelle James, Josy James & 5 other babies)
Rupert "Danny" Pink (Samuel Anderson, Remi Gooding, Jeremiah Krage)
Rigsy (Joivan Wade)
Rodrick (Paterson Joseph)
Lucy Saxon (Alexandra Moen)
William Shakespeare (Hugh Walters, Dean Lennox Kelly)
Walter Simeon (Richard E. Grant, Cameron Strefford)
Jake Simmonds (Andrew Hayden-Smith)
Luke Smith (Tommy Knight)
Professor Edward Travers (Jack Watling), Downtime
Miss Trefusis (Sylvia Seymour, Tracie Simpson)
Jackie Tyler (Camille Coduri)Jackie is not generally considered a companion to the Doctor, however she does fulfill this role in the two-part episode Army of Ghosts/Doomsday.
Pete Tyler (Shaun Dingwall)
Madame Vernet (Chrissie Cotterill)
Trinity Wells (Lachele Carl)
Brian Williams (Mark Williams)
Courtney Woods (Ellis George)

 Time Lords 

Borusa (Angus MacKay; John Arnatt; Leonard Sachs; Philip Latham)
The Castellan (Paul Jerricho)
Professor Urban Chronotis (Denis Carey [television], James Fox [webcast], Andrew Sachs [radio])
The Corsair (Elizabeth Berrington) [left arm only]
The General (Ken Bones, T'Nia Miller)
The Inquisitor (Lynda Bellingham)
Jenny (Georgia Tennant)
Chancellor Goth (Bernard Horsfall)
The Master (Roger Delgado, Peter Pratt, Geoffrey Beevers, Anthony Ainley, Gordon Tipple, Eric Roberts, Derek Jacobi, John Simm, William Hughes, Michelle Gomez, Sacha Dhawan)
The Meddling Monk (Peter Butterworth)
The Messenger (David Garth)
K'Anpo Rimpoche (Cho-Je) (Kevin Lindsay)
Omega (Stephen Thorne; Ian Collier)
The Rani (Kate O'Mara)
Rassilon (Richard Mathews, Timothy Dalton, Donald Sumpter)
Third Time Lord/Chancellor (Clyde Pollitt)
The Valeyard (Michael Jayston)
The Woman (Claire Bloom)
companions Susan Foreman, Romana, Donna Noble in her "DoctorDonna" phase, and River Song, are all Time Lords to one degree or another. Depending upon the continuity, companion Dorothy "Ace" McShane also became a Time Lord

Other beings

Delegate Alpha Centauri (body: Stuart Fell; voice: Ysanne Churchman)
Black Guardian (Valentine Dyall)
Blon Fel-Fotch Pasameer-Day Slitheen (Annette Badland)
The Face of Boe (Struan Rodger)
Edwin Bracewell (Bill Paterson)
Cyber Controller (Michael Kilgarriff, Peter Hawkins [voice only]) 
Dalek Sec, Dalek Thay, Dalek Caan and Dalek Jast (all voiced by Nicholas Briggs)
Davros (Michael Wisher, David Gooderson, Terry Molloy, Julian Bleach)
Frankenstein's monster (Boris Karloff [archival], John Maxim [Festival of Ghana robot])
The Great Intelligence (portrayed by Jack Woolgar and Richard E Grant; voiced by Wolfe Morris, Ian McKellen and Cameron Strefford)
Sabalom Glitz (Tony Selby)
Novice Hame (Anna Hope)
Icthar (body: Pat Gorman; voice: Peter Halliday; Norman Comer)
Dorium Maldovar (Simon Fisher-Becker)
Malohkeh (Richard Hope)
Nestene Consciousness
Ood Sigma (body: Paul Kasey; voice: Silas Carson)
Sil (Nabil Shaban)
Mr Smith (voice: Alexander Armstrong)
Strax (Dan Starkey)
Madame Vastra (Neve McIntosh)
White Guardian (Cyril Luckham; Gerald Cross [voice only])

Notes
Lethbridge-Stewart appeared as a regular in Seasons 7 and 8 and more sporadically in many other episodes. Nicholas Courtney, along with his role as Bret Vyon in The Daleks' Master Plan, his appearance in the charity special Dimensions in Time and his participation in the Eighth Doctor audio play Minuet in Hell, has the distinction of having acted with every screen Doctor before the Ninth and also the Tenth (although in adventures before actor David Tennant was cast as the Doctor).
The Inquisitor and The Valeyard appeared in every episode of Season 23, a season that comprised just one story, (albeit split into four segments), The Trial of a Time Lord.
Mickey Smith was a significant recurring character in the 2005 series, prior to briefly becoming a companion in the 2006 series. Similarly, Jackie Tyler appeared in many episodes of the 2005 and 2006 series; in the episodes "Army of Ghosts" and "Doomsday", she briefly travels in the TARDIS and acts like a companion, although she is not generally considered one.
The Master appeared as a regular in Season 8 and has returned numerous times in subsequent seasons and the television movie.

Recurring alien species, monsters, or robots

 Major 
Daleks
Cybermen 
Time Lords 
Sontarans
Silurians
Ice Warriors
Weeping Angels

 Secondary 
Autons (of the Nestene Consciousness)
Cybermats and Cybermites
Zygons
Ood 
The Silence
Yeti (of the Great Intelligence)
Raxacoricofallapatorians (the Slitheen family's species) 
Judoon 
Ogrons
Macra
Sea Devils 
Weevils
Thals

Characters from Doctor Who spin-off comics, novels, audio dramas and webcasts

The Doctor Who comics, novels and audio dramas have created companions, villains and supporting characters of their own. Some of these originated in one medium and later appeared in another. The lists below indicate where a character has appeared.

Companions

with the First Doctor
John and Gillian (TV Comic comic strip)
Oliver Harper (Tom Allen) (Big Finish Productions)

with the Second Doctor
John and Gillian (TV Comic comic strip)

with the Third Doctor
Jeremy Fitzoliver (The Paradise of Death and The Ghosts of N-Space radio plays)

with the Fourth Doctor
Sharon (Doctor Who Magazine comic strip)
Mike Yates (Hornets' Nest; audio drama arc announced for release Autumn 2009)

with the Fifth Doctor
Sir Justin (Doctor Who Magazine comic strip)
Angus "Gus" Goodman (Doctor Who Magazine comic strip)
Erimemushinteperem "Erimem" (Caroline Morris) (Big Finish Productions; Telos novella)
Thomas Brewster (John Pickard) (Big Finish Productions)
Amy (Ciara Janson) (Big Finish Productions)
Hannah Bartholemew (Francesca Hunt) (Big Finish Productions)

with the Sixth Doctor
Frobisher (Robert Jezek) (Doctor Who Magazine comic strip; Big Finish Productions; Past Doctor Adventures)
Grant Markham (Missing Adventures)
Angela Jennings (Missing Adventures)
Dr. Evelyn Smythe (Maggie Stables) (Big Finish Productions; Past Doctor Adventures)
Charlotte Elspeth "Charley" Pollard (India Fisher) (Big Finish Productions)
Flip Jackson (Lisa Greenwood) (Big Finish Productions)

with the Seventh Doctor
Frobisher (Doctor Who Magazine comic strip)
Thomas Hector "Hex" Schofield (Philip Olivier) (Big Finish Productions)
Bernice "Benny" Summerfield (Lisa Bowerman) (New Adventures; Big Finish Productions)
Elizabeth Klein (Tracey Childs) (Big Finish Productions)
Sally Morgan (Amy Pemberton) (Big Finish Productions)
Lysandria Aristedes (Maggie O'Neill) (Big Finish Productions)
Will Arrowsmith (Christian Edwards) (Big Finish Productions)
Chris Cwej (New Adventures)
Roz Forrester (New Adventures)
Antimony (Kevin Eldon) (Death Comes to Time)
Catherine Broome (Telos novella)

with the Eighth Doctor
Bernice "Benny" Summerfield (New Adventures; Big Finish Productions)
Izzy Sinclair (Jemima Rooper) (Doctor Who Magazine comic strip; Big Finish Productions)
Fey Truscott-Sade (Doctor Who Magazine comic strip)
Kroton (Doctor Who Magazine comic strip)
Destrii (Doctor Who Magazine comic strip)
Stacy Townsend (Radio Times comic strip)
Ssard (Radio Times comic strip)
Samantha "Sam" Jones (Eighth Doctor Adventures)
Fitz Kreiner (Matt Di Angelo) (Eighth Doctor Adventures; Big Finish Productions)
Compassion (Jackie Skarvellis) (Eighth Doctor Adventures, Faction Paradox)
Miranda (Eighth Doctor Adventures)
Anji Kapoor (Eighth Doctor Adventures)
Beatrix MacMillan (Eighth Doctor Adventures)
Charlotte Elspeth "Charley" Pollard (Big Finish Productions)
C'rizz (Conrad Westmaas) (Big Finish Productions)
Gemma Griffin (Lizzie Hopley) (Big Finish Productions)
Samson Griffin (Lee Ingleby) (Big Finish Productions)
Lucie Miller (Sheridan Smith) (Big Finish Productions)
Mary Shelley (Julie Cox) (Big Finish Productions)
Tamsin Drew (Niky Wardley) (Big Finish Productions)
Molly O'Sullivan (Ruth Bradley) (Big Finish Productions)
Liv Chenka (Nicola Walker) (Big Finish Productions)

with the Tenth Doctor
Heather McCrimmon (Doctor Who Adventures comic strip)
Majenta Pryce (Doctor Who Magazine comic strip)
Gabby Gonzalez (Titan Comics)

with the Eleventh Doctor
Kevin (IDW Comics)
Decky Flamboon ("Doctor Who Adventures") 
Pippa ("Doctor Who Adventures")
Alice Obiefune (Titan Comics)

with the Twelfth Doctor
Bernice Summerfield (New Series Adventures)
Eliza Jones (Doctor Who Adventures comic strip)
Jain Relph (Doctor Who Adventures comic strip)
Hattie Munroe (Titan Comics)
Julie d'Aubigny (Titan Comics)
Val Kent (Titan Comics)
Sonny Robinson (Titan Comics)

Other recurring or important characters
Abslom Daak (Doctor Who Magazine comic strip; New Adventures)
Beep the Meep (Toby Longworth) (Doctor Who Magazine comic strip; Big Finish Productions)
Iris Wildthyme (Katy Manning) (Eighth Doctor Adventures; Past Doctor Adventures; Big Finish Productions)
Jason Kane (Stephen Fewell) (New Adventures; Big Finish Productions)
Kadiatu Lethbridge-Stewart (New Adventures)
Muriel Frost (Karen Henson) (Doctor Who Magazine comic strip; Big Finish Productions)
Sabbath (Saul Jaffe) (Eighth Doctor Adventures; Faction Paradox)
Shayde (Mark Donovan) (Doctor Who Magazine comic strip; Big Finish Productions)
Timewyrm (New Adventures)
Irving Braxiatel (Miles Richardson) (New Adventures; Big Finish Productions'')

See also
 List of Bernice Summerfield characters
 List of Doctor Who cast members

References

Supporting characters
 
Doctor Who
Supporting Characters